Heath was a small town, now extinct, in Perry Township, Tippecanoe County, in the U.S. state of Indiana.

Geography
Heath is located at 40°27'41" North, 86°44'00" West (40.461389, -86.733333), on a bluff overlooking Wildcat Creek to the southeast.  It is in Perry Township and has an elevation of approximately 669 feet. The post office at Heath was established in 1888 and discontinued in 1902.

A few buildings in the community still exist, and it is still cited by the USGS.

References

Former populated places in Tippecanoe County, Indiana
Former populated places in Indiana